The 1914 Montana A&M football team was an American football team that represented the Montana College of Agriculture and Mechanic Arts (later renamed Montana State University) during the 1914 college football season. In its first season under head coach Fred Bennion, the team compiled a 5–1 record and outscored opponents by a total of 168 to 29. Edward Noble was the team captain. The team's quarterback was G. Ott Romney who later served as Montana State's head football coach from 1922 to 1927.

Schedule

Players

 Eugene Callaghan - end
 Myron Carr - end
 A. Christensen - tackle
 Judson Covert - halfback
 Jay Duquette - guard
 John Garvin - guard
 Cyrus Gatton - fullback
 Walter W. Grimes - quarterback
 Hodson - guard
 Albion Johnson - guard
 Lewis Jolley - end
 George R. Milburn - halfback
 Edward G. Noble - center
 Albert Osenbrug - end
 G. Ott Romney - quarterback
 Joseph Roubideaux - halfback
 Radford Taylor - tackle and captain
 C. Alonzo Truitt - tackle

References

Montana AandM
Montana State Bobcats football seasons
Montana AandM football